In music, Op. 24 stands for Opus number 24. Compositions that are assigned this number include:

 Barber – Knoxville: Summer of 1915
 Beethoven – Violin Sonata No. 5
 Berlioz – La damnation de Faust
 Bliss – A Colour Symphony
 Brahms – Variations and Fugue on a Theme by Handel
 Chopin – Mazurkas, Op. 24
 Enescu – Piano Sonata No. 1
 Enescu – Piano Sonata No. 3
 Fauré – Élégie
 Grieg – Ballade in the Form of Variations on a Norwegian Folk Song
 Hindemith – Kammermusik
 Ilyich – Eugene Onegin
 Kabalevsky – Colas Breugnon
 McGregor – Outlier
 Moroi – Sinfonietta
 Paderewski – Symphony in B minor
 Rachmaninoff – The Miserly Knight
 Ries – Violin Concerto
 Rózsa – Violin Concerto
 Schumann – Liederkreis, Op. 24
 Scriabin – Rêverie
 Spohr – Potpourri No. 4
 Strauss – Death and Transfiguration
 Szymanowski – The Love Songs of Hafiz
 Vierne – Symphony
 Voříšek – Symphony in D
 Webern – Concerto for Nine Instruments